The 1971–72 British Ice Hockey season featured the Northern League for teams from Scotland and the north of England and the Southern League for teams from the rest of England. 

Murrayfield Racers won the Northern League and Sussex Senators won the Southern League. Murrayfield Racers won the Icy Smith Cup.

Northern League

Regular season

Southern League

Regular season

Spring Cup

Final
Murrayfield Racers defeated the Dundee Rockets

Icy Smith Cup

Final
Murrayfield Racers defeated Fife Flyers	18-5

Autumn Cup

References

British
1971 in English sport
1972 in English sport
1971 in Scottish sport
1972 in Scottish sport